Walls of Gold is a 1933 American Pre-Code drama film directed by Kenneth MacKenna and starring Sally Eilers, Norman Foster, and Ralph Morgan.

Plot

Cast
 Sally Eilers as Jeanie Satterlee Ritchie  
 Norman Foster as Barnes Ritchie  
 Ralph Morgan as J. Gordon Ritchie  
 Rosita Moreno as Carla Monterez  
 Rochelle Hudson as Joan Street  
 Fred Santley as Tony Val Raalte 
 Marjorie Gateson as Cassie Street  
 Mary Mason as 'Honey' Satterlee  
 Margaret Seddon as Mrs. Satterlee

References

Bibliography
 Goble, Alan. The Complete Index to Literary Sources in Film. Walter de Gruyter, 1999.

External links
 

1933 films
1933 drama films
American drama films
Films directed by Kenneth MacKenna
Fox Film films
American black-and-white films
Films produced by Sol M. Wurtzel
Films scored by Samuel Kaylin
1930s English-language films
1930s American films